Harry Tighe (1877–1946) was an Australian playwright and novelist. Born in Newcastle, New South Wales He was Cambridge educated and spent the most active part of his career in Britain. He spent three mature years living in Cremorne, Sydney  during which he tried theatre production  as a founder of the Independent Theatre His passage to Australia was booked when he died.

Works

Plays
 1910 Four Candles
 1920 Intrigue
 1927 Open Spaces 
 1930 The Canary Waistcoat
 1931 The Bush-Fire 
 1933 The Insult (adapted for film) 
 1927 Old Mrs Wiley 
 Drastic Measures
 Penang
 Red Foam (contributor)

Novels
 1922 Women of the Hills 
 Emily Reed 
 With the Tide 
 Sheep Path 
 1908 Galore Girl 
 1908 A Man of Sympathy 
 1902 Remorse 
 1939 By The Wayside''

References

1877 births
1946 deaths
20th-century Australian novelists
Australian male novelists
Australian non-fiction writers
20th-century Australian dramatists and playwrights
Australian male dramatists and playwrights
Writers from New South Wales
20th-century Australian male writers
Male non-fiction writers